Umzingwane is a village and seat of the Umzingwane District, in Matabeleland South province, in Zimbabwe.

It has one of the most important railway stations in the nation, connecting the Beira–Bulawayo railway and the Beitbridge-Bulawayo railway.

References

Districts of Zimbabwe